Displacer is the solo electronic project of Toronto, Ontario-based musician Michael Morton.

Recordings
Morton's first released recording was the track "Deep" on Mute Records’ Pre-Set New Electronic Music in 2003.   He then signed with Paris, France-based M-Tronic Records, through which he released three CDs. In 2008 he signed to Chicago, USA label Tympanik Audio and released three more albums; The Witching Hour, X Was Never Like This..., and the mainly instrumental Night Gallery.  Foundations followed in 2012. His recent releases, Electric Dreams in 2014 and 2016's Curse of the Black Vinyl, were released under his own label. The Crime League.

Remixing
In addition to his own music, Displacer has remixed the work of other musicians, including Claire Voyant, Architect, Converter, Beefcake & Monstrum Sepsis from labels including Hymen Records, Ant-Zen, n5MD, Wax Trax, & Metropolis Records.

Discography
Moon_Phase  (2003)
Arroyo (2004)
 B(uddha)-Sides mp3 release (2006)
 Cage Fighter's Lullaby (2006)
 Remixes For Free? mp3 release (2006)
 The Witching Hour (2008)
 X Was Never Like This... (2009)
 Lost Mission EP (2009)
 Night Gallery (2011)
 Foundation (2012)

References

External links
Official site
M-tronic.com
Tympanik Audio
Displacer on Discogs.com

Canadian electronic music groups
Musical groups from Toronto
Musical groups established in 2003
2003 establishments in Ontario